Breggia is a Swiss-Italian river. It enters Swiss territory between Erbonne and Scudellate, and flows along the Muggio Valley until Chiasso/Vacallo, where it again enters Italian territory, in Maslianico.

External links
Hydrological station and data of Breggia river (near Ponte Polenta)

Rivers of Ticino
Rivers of Lombardy
Rivers of the Province of Como
International rivers of Europe
Rivers of Italy
Rivers of Switzerland